Terry Brennan (24 May 1942 – 19 June 2020) was an Irish Fine Gael politician. He was elected to Seanad Éireann on the Labour Panel in April 2011. He was a member of Louth County Council from 1985 to 2011 representing the Dundalk-Carlingford electoral area.

He was an unsuccessful candidate for the Louth constituency at the 1997 and 2002 general elections. He was the Fine Gael Seanad spokesperson on Tourism and Sport between 2011 and 2016. He lost his seat in April 2016.

References

1942 births
2020 deaths
Fine Gael senators
Local councillors in County Louth
Members of the 24th Seanad
Politicians from County Louth
People from Carlingford, County Louth